This is a season-by-season list of records compiled by Brown in men's ice hockey.

Brown University has made four appearances in the NCAA Tournament, winning two of seven games played and reaching the championship game in 1951.

Season-by-season results

Note: GP = Games played, W = Wins, L = Losses, T = Ties

* Winning percentage is used when conference schedules are unbalanced.The Ivy League is an unofficial ice hockey conference.

Footnotes

References

 
Lists of college men's ice hockey seasons in the United States
Brown Bears ice hockey seasons